Plateros volatus is a species of net-winged beetles in the family Lycidae. It is found in North America.

References

 Green, John Wagener (1953). "The Lycidae of the United States and Canada. V. Plateros (Coleoptera)". Transactions of the American Entomological Society, vol. 78, nos. 3-4, 149–181.

Further reading

 Arnett, R.H. Jr., M. C. Thomas, P. E. Skelley and J. H. Frank. (eds.). (2002). American Beetles, Volume II: Polyphaga: Scarabaeoidea through Curculionoidea. CRC Press LLC, Boca Raton, FL.
 
 Richard E. White. (1983). Peterson Field Guides: Beetles. Houghton Mifflin Company.

Lycidae